Nicholas Alexander Leitz (born October 15, 1996) is an American professional stock car racing driver. He last competed part-time in the NASCAR Camping World Truck Series, driving the Nos. 33 and 43 Chevrolet Silverados for Reaume Brothers Racing. He also competed in CARS Tour.

Motorsports career results

NASCAR
(key) (Bold – Pole position awarded by qualifying time. Italics – Pole position earned by points standings or practice time. * – Most laps led.)

Camping World Truck Series

 Season still in progress

References

External links
 

1996 births
NASCAR drivers
CARS Tour drivers
American racing drivers
Racing drivers from Virginia
Living people